The 2017 Benin Premier League (Championnat National de la Ligue 1) started on 8 July 2017.

First round
The top three teams of each poule advance to the final round, while the bottom two (or three) are relegated.

Poule A

Poule B

Final round
Teams only play those of other group twice; head-to-head results from the initial group stage are not carried over.

 1.Buffles du Borgou de Parakou (Borgou)        6   5  1  0  10- 3  16  Champions
 2.Energie FC (Cotonou)                         6   4  0  2   7- 4  12
 3.JA Cotonou                                   6   3  0  3   6- 6   9
 4.ASPAC (Cotonou)                              6   1  2  3   5- 5   5
 5.AS Oussou Saka (Porto-Novo)                  6   1  2  3   2- 6   5
 6.ESAE                                         6   1  1  4   4-10   4

References

External links
Soccerway

Benin Premier League
Benin